Kathleen Cardone (born December 25, 1953) is a United States district judge of the United States District Court for the Western District of Texas.

Early life and education
Born in Medina, New York, Cardone graduated from Binghamton University with her Bachelor of Arts degree in 1976 and later from the St. Mary's University School of Law where she earned her Juris Doctor in 1979.

Legal career
Cardone started her legal career as a briefing attorney for Magistrate Judge Philip A. Schraub, a U.S. District Court for the Southern District of Texas. She held that role from 1979 to 1980. She was in private practice in Texas from 1980 to 1990. She was a judge on the Municipal Court for the City of El Paso from 1983 to 1990. She was an Associate judge for the Family Law Court of Texas from 1990 to 1995. She was a judge on the 383rd Judicial District Court of Texas from 1995 to 1996. Cardone worked as an Attorney/mediator for Texas Arbitration Mediation Services from 1997 to 1999. She was an Instructor (part-time) at El Paso Community College from 1997 to 2003. She was a judge on the 388th Judicial District Court of Texas from 1999 to 2000. She was a Mediator, Texas Arbitration Mediation Services from 2001 to 2003. She was a Visiting judge, State of Texas from 2001 to 2003.

Federal judicial career

In 2003, Cardone was nominated to the United States District Court for the Western District of Texas by President George W. Bush on May 1, 2003, to a new seat created by 116 Stat. 1758. Cardone was confirmed by the Senate on July 28, 2003. She received her commission the next day.

Notable cases

In August 2021, Cardone issued a temporary injunction in the case U.S. vs Texas and Greg Abbott against an executive order by Texas Governor Greg Abbott to have Texas state troopers stop vehicles suspected of carrying illegal immigrants, who might be infected with COVID-19.

See also
List of Hispanic/Latino American jurists

References

Sources

1953 births
Living people
American women lawyers
Binghamton University alumni
Hispanic and Latino American judges
Judges of the United States District Court for the Western District of Texas
People from Medina, New York
St. Mary's University School of Law alumni
Texas state court judges
United States district court judges appointed by George W. Bush
21st-century American judges
21st-century American women judges